WBCSD may refer to:
 World Business Council for Sustainable Development
 West Bolivar Consolidated School District